Preschool Education in America: The Culture of Young Children from the Colonial Era to the Present is a 1995 history of preschool education in the United States written by Barbara Beatty.

Bibliography

External links 
 

1995 non-fiction books
History books about education
English-language books
Yale University Press books